Robert Redfern (3 March 1918 – 3 July 2002) was an English professional footballer who played as an outside right in the Football League for Bournemouth & Boscombe Athletic and Brighton & Hove Albion. He was on he books of Wolverhampton Wanderers without playing for their first team, and played non-league football for Tow Law Town, Cradley Heath, Weymouth and Bournemouth.

Life and career
Redfern was born in Crook, County Durham, in 1918. He played football for Tow Law Town before joining Wolverhampton Wanderers in 1936 as an 18-year-old. His stay was brief: he was farmed out to Cradley Heath of the Birmingham & District League before signing for Bournemouth & Boscombe Athletic of the Third Division South in February 1937.

He, together with Cradley winger and future England international, Jack Rowley, went straight into the team for the visit to Walsall on 27 February. Redfern made 89 league appearances for Bournemouth over ten years, seven of which were lost to the Second World War, during which he played as a guest for clubs including Crystal Palace, Fulham, Luton Town and York City. At the beginning of the 1939–40 Football League season, Redfern scored twice as Bournemouth beat Northampton Town 10–0, a club record victory which would,  still stand had the season not been abandoned because of the war and all results expunged. He finished his Football League career with a season at Brighton & Hove Albion.

He then returned to the south west, where he played non-league football for Weymouth and Bournemouth F.C., and later acted as secretary of the latter club. As a youngster, Redfern had received a scholarship which gave him free secondary education, a luxury for which his father, an unemployed coal miner, would not have been able to payhe was still at school when he signed for Wolvesand he went on to work as a schoolteacher in Bournemouth. Redfern was married to Betty; the couple had two children, Sylvia and Robert. He died at the Royal Bournemouth Hospital in 2002 at the age of 84.

References

1918 births
2002 deaths
People from Crook, County Durham
Footballers from County Durham
English footballers
Association football outside forwards
Tow Law Town F.C. players
Wolverhampton Wanderers F.C. players
Cradley Heath F.C. players
AFC Bournemouth players
Brighton & Hove Albion F.C. players
Weymouth F.C. players
Bournemouth F.C. players
English Football League players
Western Football League players
Crystal Palace F.C. wartime guest players
Fulham F.C. wartime guest players
Luton Town F.C. wartime guest players
York City F.C. wartime guest players